Agripina Prima Rahmanto Putra also known as Agripina Prima Rahmanto Pamungkas (born 20 January 1991) is an Indonesian badminton player from Jaya Raya Jakarta badminton club. He was selected to join the national team in 2010.

Personal life 
He is the son of the former Indonesian badminton player Sigit Pamungkas. He graduated at the Montfort Secondary School in Singapore.

Achievements

ASEAN University Games 
Mixed doubles

BWF Grand Prix 
The BWF Grand Prix had two levels, the Grand Prix and Grand Prix Gold. It was a series of badminton tournaments sanctioned by the Badminton World Federation (BWF) and played between 2007 and 2017.

Men's doubles

 BWF Grand Prix Gold tournament
  BWF Grand Prix tournament

BWF International Challenge/Series 
Men's doubles

Mixed doubles

  BWF International Challenge tournament
  BWF International Series tournament

Performance timeline

Individual competitions 
 Senior level

References

External links 
 

1991 births
Living people
Indonesian male badminton players
21st-century Indonesian people